Britney Gutknecht (born 20 April 2001) is an Australian rules footballer who plays for Western Bulldogs in the AFL Women's (AFLW). It was revealed that Gutknecht had signed a contract extension with the club on 16 June 2021, after playing 4 games for the club that season.

Statistics
Statistics are correct to the end of the 2021 season.

|-
| scope=row | 2020 ||  || 18
| 2 || 0 || 0 || 8 || 6 || 14 || 3 || 7 || 0.0 || 0.0 || 4.0 || 3.0 || 7.0 || 1.5 || 3.5 || 0
|- style=background:#EAEAEA
| scope=row | 2021 ||  || 18
| 4 || 0 || 0 || 11 || 18 || 29 || 2 || 13 || 0.0 || 0.0 || 2.8 || 4.5 || 7.3 || 0.5 || 3.3 || 0
|- class=sortbottom
! colspan=3 | Career
! 6 !! 0 !! 0 !! 19 !! 24 !! 43 !! 5 !! 20 !! 0.0 !! 0.0 !! 3.2 !! 4.0 !! 7.2 !! 0.8 !! 3.3 !! 0
|}

References

External links

 

Living people
2001 births
Northern Knights players (NAB League Girls)
Western Bulldogs (AFLW) players
Australian rules footballers from Victoria (Australia)
Sportswomen from Victoria (Australia)